Spilarctia ruficosta is a moth in the family Erebidae. It was described by James John Joicey and George Talbot in 1916. It is found on New Guinea. It is endemic to the Arfak Mountains in Papua.

References

Moths described in 1916
ruficosta